The Civic Democratic Party (ODS) leadership election of 2010 in the Czech Republic was a part of the party's congress. It was held after the party's unexpected victory in the legislative election. Petr Nečas was the only candidate in the election.

617 delegates were allowed to vote, of which 601 votes were valid. Nečas received 538 votes and thus was elected.

Voting

References

2010
Civic Democratic Party leadership election
Civic Democratic Party leadership election
Single-candidate elections
Indirect elections
Elections in Prague
Civic Democratic Party leadership election
Civic Democratic Party leadership election